The Manurewa Local Board is one of the 21 local boards of the Auckland Council. It is overseen by the Manurewa-Papakura ward councillor.

The local board area includes the areas of Wiri, Hillpark,  Manurewa East, Homai, Weymouth and Wattle Downs.

Demographics

Manurewa Local Board Area had a population of 95,670 at the 2018 New Zealand census, an increase of 13,428 people (16.3%) since the 2013 census, and an increase of 18,480 people (23.9%) since the 2006 census. There were 23,562 households, comprising 47,841 males and 47,826 females, giving a sex ratio of 1.0 males per female. The median age was 29.5 years (compared with 37.4 years nationally), with 24,687 people (25.8%) aged under 15 years, 23,985 (25.1%) aged 15 to 29, 39,021 (40.8%) aged 30 to 64, and 7,977 (8.3%) aged 65 or older.

Ethnicities were 29.2% European/Pākehā, 26.0% Māori, 36.3% Pacific peoples, 25.4% Asian, and 2.7% other ethnicities. People may identify with more than one ethnicity.

The percentage of people born overseas was 36.3, compared with 27.1% nationally.

Although some people chose not to answer the census's question about religious affiliation, 28.1% had no religion, 46.1% were Christian, 2.8% had Māori religious beliefs, 7.6% were Hindu, 2.7% were Muslim, 1.6% were Buddhist and 5.4% had other religions.

Of those at least 15 years old, 10,281 (14.5%) people had a bachelor's or higher degree, and 14,673 (20.7%) people had no formal qualifications. The median income was $27,400, compared with $31,800 nationally. 7,311 people (10.3%) earned over $70,000 compared to 17.2% nationally. The employment status of those at least 15 was that 35,928 (50.6%) people were employed full-time, 7,569 (10.7%) were part-time, and 4,377 (6.2%) were unemployed.

2019–2022 term
The current board members, elected at the 2019 local body elections, are:
Joseph Allan, Manurewa Action Team – (7027 votes)
Anne Candy, Manurewa Action Team – (6712 votes)
Rangi Mclean, Manurewa Action Team – (6695 votes)
Ken Penney, Manurewa Action Team – (6682 votes)
Glenn Murphy, Manurewa Action Team – (6041 votes)
Melissa Atama, Manurewa Action Team – (6030 votes)
David Pizzini, Manurewa Action Team – (5843 votes)
Tabetha Gorrie, Manurewa Action Team – (4963 votes)

2016–2019 term
The board members who served from the 2016 local body elections to the 2019 elections were:
 Angela Dalton (Chair)
 Stella Cattle (Deputy chair)
 Joseph Allan
 Rangi McLean
 Sarah Colcord
 Angela Cunningham-Marino
 Ken Penney
 Dave Pizzini

References

Local boards of the Auckland Region